Jack Nilson is an American mixed martial artist.

Mixed martial arts record

|-
| Loss
| align=center| 2-6
| George Randolph
| Submission (strikes)
| RSF 1: Redemption in the Valley
| 
| align=center| 1
| align=center| 1:38
| Wheeling, West Virginia, United States
| 
|-
| Win
| align=center| 2-5
| Stu Hesselmeyer
| Submission (strikes)
| RSF: Circle of Truth 1
| 
| align=center| 1
| align=center| 2:44
| Savannah, Georgia, United States
| 
|-
| Loss
| align=center| 1-5
| Nate Schroeder
| Submission (kneebar)
| Rings USA: Rising Stars Final
| 
| align=center| 1
| align=center| 0:36
| Moline, Illinois, United States
| 
|-
| Loss
| align=center| 1-4
| John Dixson
| Submission (heel hook)
| WEF: New Blood Conflict
| 
| align=center| 1
| align=center| 0:32
| 
| 
|-
| Loss
| align=center| 1-3
| J.J. Wilson
| TKO
| ISCF: Spring Showdown 2000
| 
| align=center| 1
| align=center| 4:45
| Augusta, Georgia, United States
| 
|-
| Loss
| align=center| 1-2
| J.J. Wilson
| Submission
| ISCF: Winter Wars 2000
| 
| align=center| 3
| align=center| 0:00
| Augusta, Georgia, United States
| 
|-
| Win
| align=center| 1-1
| Saeed Hosseini
| TKO (punches)
| UFC 13: The Ultimate Force
| 
| align=center| 1
| align=center| 1:23
| Augusta, Georgia, United States
| 
|-
| Loss
| align=center| 0-1
| Tai Bowden
| Submission (headbutts)
| UFC: Ultimate Ultimate 1996
| 
| align=center| 1
| align=center| 4:46
| Birmingham, Alabama, United States
|

See also
List of male mixed martial artists

References

External links
 
 Jack Nilson at MixedMartialArts.com

American male mixed martial artists
Living people
Year of birth missing (living people)
Ultimate Fighting Championship male fighters